Robiola  is an Italian soft-ripened cheese of the Stracchino family.  It is from the Langhe region and made with varying proportions of cow's, goat's, and sheep's milk.  One theory is that the cheese gets its name from the town of Robbio in the province of Pavia; another that the name comes from the word rubeole (ruddy) because of the color of the seasoned rind.

Varieties of Robiola are produced across Piedmont from the provinces of Cuneo, Asti and Alessandria and into Lombardy. It is one of the specialties of the Aosta Valley. The taste and appearance of Robiola varies depending upon where it was produced.  Robiola di Roccaverano DOP / DOC has no rind and a slightly straw-yellow coloring with a sweet, yielding taste.  Robiola Lombardia has a thin, milky-white to pink rind and tends to be shaped like small rolls.  The cream-colored cheese underneath its bloomy rind has a smooth, full, tangy and mildly sour flavor, likely due to the high (52%) fat content.  Its rind can be cut away, but is mild with no ammonia and adds a subtle crunch to the cheese. La Tur has a cake-like rind over a  tangy-lactic layer of cream and is representative of Piedmont's Robiola style of cheese where the fresh curds are ladled into molds, and drain under their own weight before aging rather than by pressing with weights. Robiola from the Piedmont region is a fresh cheese, and is usually eaten on its own, or with a little honey.

The cheese has a long history that is sometimes traced back to the Celto-Ligurian farmers of the Alta Langa: the virtues of a cheese from Ceba (today Ceva) were extolled by the first-century Pliny the Elder in his Natural History, but any identification of that cheese with the Robiola of today must be speculative. However, in his Summa Lacticiniorum, the fifteenth-century dairy produce expert Pantaleone da Confienza did describe the manufacture, and praise the quality, of a cheese with this name.

Robiola is generally served as a table cheese, either alone or with oil, salt and pepper. It must be stored properly after being purchased, and will keep fresh for up to one month.  Its tangy taste is attributable to being infused with the wild herbs on which the animals pasture.  Robiola can also be used in cooking including famous Piemonte dishes such as "risotto robiola" and "aglio robiola spaghetti" and other dishes.  Special care should be exercised in properly storing the cheese (do not wrap in plastic, as the cheese can "choke" and spoil).  It is best stored refrigerated unwrapped in its crust or wrapped in paper, and used within a week of purchase.

See also
 List of cheeses

References

External links
 ItalianMade
 "It's all in the blend for this Robiola", Janet Fletcher, San Francisco Chronicle, 6/7/05 San Francisco Chronicle Online
 Italian Cooking and Living  
 Pliny on the cheese that might be Robiola in Book 11 of the Natural History:
  at Perseus
  at LacusCurtius

Italian cheeses
Piedmontese cheeses
Cow's-milk cheeses
Goat's-milk cheeses
Sheep's-milk cheeses
Italian products with protected designation of origin
Ark of Taste foods